Leucolepisma is a genus of Zygentoma in the family Lepismatidae, containing only one described species, Leucolepisma arenarium.

References

Lepismatidae
Monotypic insect genera